Queen City Rocker is a 1986 New Zealand film which was sold by Richard Lymposs, a sixteen-year-old youth with no prior film or writing experience. Queen City Rocker was bought by Larry Parr a budding Auckland film producer in 1981 and shot in 1985. It was directed by Bruce Morrison, and starred Matthew Hunter, Mark Pilisi and Kim Willoughby. The film is also called "Tearaway".

The original story focused on the friendship between two buddies in actual warring gangs of that time in Auckland. No mention of these two gangs were in the film.

It is understood the Auckland Street gangs "The Boot Boys" and the "King Cobras" were the inspiration behind this story. In 1979–1981 in Auckland these two warring enemies had vicious street brawls – even in New Zealand's main street, Queen Street, before horror struck late night shoppers, making front-page news of New Zealand papers, where racial issues were often glossed over as harmonious.

The original story made statement to the paradox of friendship, where both youths were technically enemies, caught in amongst the lower socioeconomic times thwart with violence, in a racially charged environment, aligning with different gangs. (The Pakeha and Maori between the first generation Samoan youths). The Punk/Ska/Reggae music of the late-1970's to early-1980's was vibrant and a relevant under-swell in the Auckland music scene.

By the time Queen City Rocker was filmed the script had been softened for a potential commercial market, as had the soundtrack, and when the film was in the can the reference between real gangs had been lost and the two stars were buddies in the same "group", the term "gang" had become unpalatable.

Synopsis
After deciding to "rescue" his sister from a massage parlor, a streetwise 19 year old is thrown out in the attempt. As the massage parlour boss is a crooked concert promoter, he and his gang plot revenge by hijacking a concert which incites the audience to riot.

Cast

References

External links

1986 films
1986 drama films
1986 in New Zealand
New Zealand drama films
1980s English-language films